Daniel Baharier (born in 1956) is an Israeli artist and sculptor. His works, dealing with human movement, appear at the Wingate Institute at Assaf Harofeh Hospital, Sheba Medical Center and other public buildings in Israel and the world, such as New York and Tokyo. He also uses sculptural installations, collages and more.

Biography 

Daniel Baharier was born in England in 1956 in the city of London in Croydon to Sydney and Miriam Baharier.

At 18 he began studying art in Hertfordshire college of Art and Design, under the training of John Mills and Michael Gillespie. He then went on to study sculpture at the Leicester Polytechnic, University of Simone de Montfort under Sydney Herfli.

In 1980 he immigrated to Israel from London and began studying at Bezalel. After a year he decided to leave school because he felt that the level of study is not appropriate for him, as he finished five years of academic art studies in England.

From 1981 to 1982 he worked at the foundry in Atarot in Jerusalem and then at the foundry AP Netanya. Foundries worked for other artists in creating a patina and negatives for their works. Daniels personal works during this period were the first in exploring human motion, and women acrobatic movements that create physical stress.

Between 1983-1985 he served in the IDF deliberately M61 Vulcan, especially in Lebanon. After completing his military service, He began with a sculpture foundry shalom Saktsier in Rishon Lezion. Between 1985-1987 he worked on the sculpture depicting parallel lines and broken symmetry, and is based on mathematical formulas.

In 1986-1987 he was a professor at the School of Art Sculpture school Ascola-meimad. In 1988 he opened his studio in the ancient port of Jaffa, where he worked for 13 years. During these years he developed his unique style, and created the sculpture at Assaf Harofeh Hospital, a portrait of Dr. Wim Malgo.

In 1990- 2004 he taught at Old City of Jaffa Art College bronze casting, mould-making, plaster, clay, plastics and welding.

In 1994-5, he was commissioned by Emilio Pellus, head of EDF Construction & Investments Ltd., to create 24 pieces, each one 3 to 3.5 (10–12 feet) meters in height, depicting figures from the Jewish Diaspora of a hundred years ago, for his Carmel Shuk 2000 project in Rishon-Le-Zion. At the time it was the largest commission of its type in Israel.

In 1993 created the sculpture "Fantasy of Legends" just dance, which was introduced two months on the beach in Tel Aviv, Jerusalem.
In 1997 he participated in the exhibition "Second Hand", Tel Aviv Museum of Art in Tel Aviv, the statue "broken symmetry". In the same year he took part in the London gallery Cooltan called "Pay Roll", and presented the sculpture, "one of four". The sculpture presented four characters, which seemingly identical, apart from changes in haircuts and placing of the statue.

In 2001, 21 small sculptures to be placed at the Wingate Institute, which currently has three giant statues. Their sizes are three and a half meters high on average. Today, His sculptures are placed in Tokyo, London, New York, Paris, Japan and more.

MK, Meir shitrit Cabinet Minister, has five of His sculptures in his collection.

Baharier has his Workshop today located on the border of Jaffa and Tel Aviv.

References 

 The artists web page http://danielbaharier-artandsculpturesite.com/commissions.htm
 http://www.artmajeur.com/en/artist/baharier/portfolio
 http://fineartamerica.com/profiles/daniel-baharier.html

Living people
1956 births
Israeli male sculptors
Artists from London